Johnny English Strikes Again is a 2018 spy action comedy film directed by David Kerr. It is the sequel to  Johnny English Reborn (2011) and is the third and final installment of the Johnny English series. The film stars Rowan Atkinson in the title role, alongside Ben Miller, Olga Kurylenko, Jake Lacy and Emma Thompson. The film follows the titular MI7 agent who is called into action, when all undercover operatives are exposed in a cyber attack.

The film was released in cinemas in the United Kingdom on 5 October 2018 and in the United States on 26 October 2018, by Universal Pictures. The film received slightly negative reviews from critics but was a box office success, grossing $159 million worldwide with its $25 million budget.

Plot
Seven years after the events of the second film, a cyber attack exposes MI7’s field agents, forcing the agency to reinstate older inactive agents, including Johnny English. Now a geography teacher, he secretly trains his students in espionage.

Accidentally incapacitating the other retired agents, English is the sole agent left to accept the mission. He insists on his old sidekick and MI7 clerk, Angus Bough. Collecting their equipment, including explosive jelly babies and a tracker disguised as a Sherbet Fountain, English and Bough leave behind their mobile and drive an old Aston Martin to France to investigate.

They arrive at the Hotel Magnifique in Antibes, where the cyber attack originated. Undercover as waiters, they steal a mobile with a photo of the next target, the Dot Calm yacht, and English accidentally sets fire to the restaurant. Sneaking onto the yacht, he and Bough are caught by Russian operative Ophelia Bhuletova, but escape after seeing many computer servers.

Pursuing Bhuletova's electric BMW through the countryside, English and Bough run out of fuel. She finds them, arranging to meet at the Hotel de Paris in Cagnes-sur-Mer. While English meets her at the hotel bar, Bough discovers she is a spy, but English rejects his suspicions. Attempting to kill him upon nightfall, she fails after a sleepless English accidentally takes energy pills instead of sleeping pills.

Further cyber attacks force the Prime Minister to solidify an agreement with Silicon Valley billionaire Jason Volta, to be revealed during a forthcoming G12 meeting.

Learning Volta owns the Dot Calm, and suspecting he is behind the cyber attack, English and Bough return home. Seeking proof, they must infiltrate Volta's mansion. In preparation, English is given a virtual reality exploration of the building. However, he unintentionally leaves the simulation room, assaulting various people while in the virtual environment (including battering the manager of a local cafe with two baguettes, and commandeering an Open Top Routemaster by pushing the tour guide off the top deck).A group of people see him pushing the man off the top deck in a meeting room.

Arriving at the mansion, English discovers Bhuletova is also a spy. He records evidence of Volta's plans with her iPhone, but accidentally presses the wrong button, playing music from the phone and exposing himself. English escapes, hijacking a driving instructor's car, returning to MI7 after being chased by Volta. However, he mixes up iPhones with the driving student, so fails to convince MI7 and the Prime Minister of Volta's schemes. Hearing of both the restaurant and virtual reality incidents, she fires English, Bough and Pegasus and proceeds with the G12 meeting in Scotland. Bough convinces him to stop Volta anyway, enlisting his wife Lydia's aid, a Navy captain of submarine HMS Vengeance, to arrive at Garroch Castle via Loch Nevis.

Bhuletova attempts to kill Volta but, knowing she is a spy, he has immunized himself to her poison ring and removed her gun's firing pin. Scaling the castle using a powered bodysuit, English intervenes before Volta can kill her, who escapes. Volta plans to extort the G12 leaders by threatening to shut down the internet. English calls MI7, but forgets Lydia's warning about using a mobile near the submarine.

An MI7 secretary unintentionally places two telephones next to each other: one on a call from English, the other from Lydia, calling to confirm a launch code English inadvertently keyed in. Mistakenly given the order to attack by English, Lydia launches a ballistic missile. The missile diverts to a Sherbet Fountain beacon left by English on the Dot Calm, destroying the yacht and Volta's server. English, in a suit of armour, Bough and Bhuletova chase Volta to his helicopter as he prepares to reroute the attack to a server in Nevada.

Bhuletova gives English a tablet to disable Volta's Aerospatiale Gazelle helicopter. When Volta mocks English's inability to use digital technology, he throws the tablet at Volta, hitting him in the head and knocking him out, then smashes his phone with a sword to stop the attack. The Prime Minister praises and forgives English for his attitude, who accidentally disrobes before the press and G12 leaders while removing the armor.

English returns to his school as a guest speaker, welcomed by his students. However, to his horror, he sees the headmaster about to eat one of the explosive Jelly babies.

Cast 
 Rowan Atkinson as Johnny English, Esq., a geography teacher and retired MI7 agent who is reinstated for a mission.
 Ben Miller as Angus Bough, an MI7 agent and former assistant to English.
 Olga Kurylenko as Ophelia Bhuletova, a Russian spy. Kurylenko previously portrayed Camille Montes in the James Bond film Quantum of Solace.
 Jake Lacy as Jason Volta, a Silicon Valley tech billionaire who is promoting a system that could improve data management. 
 Emma Thompson as Prime Minister of the United Kingdom
 Adam James as Pegasus, the head of MI7.
 Amit Shah as Samir, assistant to the Prime Minister
 Matthew Beard as P, weapon expert of MI7
 Vicki Pepperdine as Lydia, Bough's wife and a Royal Navy officer
 Pippa Bennett-Warner as Lesley, secretary to Pegasus
 Roger Barclay as Sebastian Lynch, a suspect 
 Irena Tyshyna as Viola Lynch, Sebastian's wife
 Pauline McLynn as Mrs. Trattner
 Gus Brown as The headmaster at the school 
 Michael Gambon as Agent Five
 Charles Dance as Agent Seven
 Edward Fox as Agent Nine
 Kevin Eldon as MI7 Night Duty Agent (uncredited)

Production 
In May 2017, it was announced that Rowan Atkinson would be returning to take the role of Johnny English in the sequel to the film Johnny English Reborn (2011). On 3 August 2017, Working Title Films announced that they had begun production and filming with the director David Kerr. The cinematographer was Florian Hoffmeister. This is the second spy film starring both Rowan Atkinson and Edward Fox, who appears in a minor role as the retired Agent Nine (Atkinson and Fox had both appeared earlier in the 1983 non-Eon James Bond film Never Say Never Again).

The production designer was Simon Bowles, who won an award for his designs for this movie at the 2019 British Film Designers Guild Awards, shared with set decorator Liz Griffiths and supervising art director Ben Collins. Parts were also filmed in Welham Green, Hertfordshire; and in Gloucestershire. Filming continued in France from 26 September, at the Saint Aygulf beach in Var.

On 4 April 2018, the title was revealed to be Johnny English Strikes Again, with a teaser trailer released the day after.

Release

Theatrical

Johnny English Strikes Again was scheduled to be released in both the United Kingdom and United States on 12 October 2018 by Universal Pictures; the date for the United States was later moved up to 20 September 2018, before being pushed back to 26 October 2018. It was released in Portugal on 5 October 2018 by Cinemax Angola.

Home media

The film was set to be released digitally on 4 February 2019, and on DVD, Blu-Ray, and 4K UltraHD format on February 18, alongside a box set of all three movies in the franchise. In Australia, the film's digital release was moved up to 19 December 2018 while the Blu-Ray and DVD release in the United States and Canada was January 22, 2019.

Reception

Box office
Johnny English Strikes Again has grossed $4.4 million in the United States and Canada, and $154.5 million elsewhere (including $23.2 million in the United Kingdom), for a total worldwide gross of $159 million.

In the United States and Canada, Johnny English Strikes Again was released alongside Hunter Killer and Indivisible as well as the wide expansion of Mid90s, and was projected to gross around $2 million from
544 theaters in its opening weekend. It ended up debuting to $1.6 million, finishing 12th at the box office. Deadline Hollywood noted the film's American release was essentially a formality, as it was not built for the audience in the United States, and thus the low opening wasn't seen as a disappointment to the studio.

Outside North America, the film debuted to $5.5 million in the United Kingdom and grossed $14.1 million overall in its second week for a to date total gross of $66.5 million. In its third weekend of international release, the film added another $9.8 million from 57 countries, including a $2.4 million opening in Germany, and a running cume of $96 million.

Critical response
The website's critical consensus reads, "Johnny English Strikes Again might get a few giggles out of viewers pining for buffoonish pratfalls, but for the most part, this sequel simply strikes out." On Metacritic, the film has a weighted average score of 39 out of 100, based on 22 critics, indicating "generally unfavorable reviews".

Future 
In a Reddit AMA thread in October of 2018, when asked about more Johnny English films, Rowan Atkinson replied with: "I doubt it but thank you very much for implying you'd like to see another one. But at the same time...never say never ;)".

Notes

References

External links 
 
 

2018 films
2010s adventure films
2010s parody films
Johnny English
French action comedy films
English-language French films
French parody films
French sequel films
French spy comedy films
British action comedy films
British parody films
British sequel films
British spy comedy films
American action comedy films
American parody films
American sequel films
American spy comedy films
Films about police officers
Films about virtual reality
Films produced by Eric Fellner
Films produced by Tim Bevan
Films set in Asia
Films set in Europe
Films set in France
Films set in Japan
Films set in London
Films set in Singapore
Films set in Tokyo
Films set in the United Kingdom
Films shot in France
Films shot in London
Films shot in Singapore
Films shot in Tokyo
Intelligence agencies in fiction
Films with screenplays by William Davies
2010s spy comedy films
Perfect World Pictures films
StudioCanal films
Universal Pictures films
Working Title Films films
Films directed by David Kerr (director)
2010s English-language films
2010s American films
2010s French films
2018 directorial debut films